The Feminist Party of Canada was founded in 1979.

The party was launched at the Ontario Institute for Studies in Education on 10 June 1979. Mary O'Brien and Angela Miles were keynote speakers at the launch event.

References

Feminism in Canada
Feminist parties in North America
Political parties in Canada